Jaramogi Oginga Odinga University of Science and Technology(JOOUST), is a public university in Kenya. It is named after  independence leader and Kenya's first Vice-President Jaramogi Oginga Odinga, and father to 21st century politician Raila Odinga.

Prof. Stephen G. Agong’, PHD, FAAS, has been the Vice Chancellor of JOOUST since 2013.

Location
The geographical coordinates of the university's main campus are 0°05'38.0"S, 34°15'31.0"E (Latitude:-0.093889; Longitude:34.258611).

Overview
JOOUST was founded in 2009, through a Legal Order, as Bondo University College, a constituent college of Maseno University. In 2013, the law was repealed and the university received its own charter as an independent institution of higher education.

Academics
As of February 2019, the university maintained the following academic units:
 Schools
 School of Agricultural and Food Sciences
 School of Biological & Physical Sciences
 School of Business & Economics
 School of Education
 School of Engineering and Technology
 School of Health Sciences
 School of Humanities & Social Sciences
 School of Informatics & Innovative Systems
 School of Mathematics and Actuarial Sciences
 School of Spatial Planning and Natural Resource Management

 
Institutes
 Institute of Cultural Heritage and Material Science
 East African Community Integration Institute

 Centers

 Center for Research Innovation and Technology
 Centre for Gender Mainstreaming and Development
 Centre for Outreach and Extension Services
 Centre for E-Learning
 Africa Center of Excellence in Sustainable Use of Insects as Food and Feeds (INSEFOODS).

Future plans
In February 2019, the Business Daily Africa reported that JOOUST in partnership with Siaya County Administration planned to establish a set up a constituent college named after former US president Barack Obama. The institution will focus on research in fisheries, agriculture and promote extension services for local farmers.

References

External links

Overview of Jaramogi Oginga Odinga University of Science and Technology

Universities and colleges in Kenya
2009 establishments in Kenya
Siaya County
Educational institutions established in 2009